Brian Tyrrell (died 19 April 2009) was an Irish football player who played as a forward.

Career
Tyrrell was born in Dublin and signed for Shamrock Rovers in 1961. In September 1963 he emigrated to New York City along with Tony O'Connell. He made 2 appearances in the Inter-Cities Fairs Cup against previous winners Real Zaragoza in 1965. Within days of winning the 1966 FAI Cup he signed for Australian side Sydney United. Tyrrell returned home to sign for Drogheda United in October 1967. He died on 19 April 2009.

Honours
FAI Cup
Shamrock Rovers 1966
League of Ireland Shield
Shamrock Rovers 1965/66
Top Four Cup
Shamrock Rovers 1965/66

Sources
The Hoops by Paul Doolan and Robert Goggins

References

Republic of Ireland association footballers
Shamrock Rovers F.C. players
Drogheda United F.C. players
League of Ireland players
2009 deaths
Year of birth missing
Association footballers not categorized by position